State Route 120 (SR 120) is a state highway in the central part of California, connecting the San Joaquin Valley with the Sierra Nevada, Yosemite National Park, and the Mono Lake area. Its western terminus is at Interstate 5 in Lathrop, and its eastern terminus at U.S. Route 6 in Benton. While the route is signed as a contiguous route through Yosemite, the portion inside the park is federally maintained and is not included in the state route logs. The portion at Tioga Pass at Yosemite's eastern boundary is the highest paved through road in the California State Route system. This part is not maintained in the winter and is usually closed during the winter season.

Route description

SR 120 begins as a freeway intersecting Interstate 5 to extend Interstate 205 through Manteca. In east Manteca the freeway ends at SR 99 and becomes a highway which continues to head east through Escalon, Oakdale and other various small towns.  East of Oakdale there are no highly populated areas for 90 miles (144 km) as it heads into the foothills of the Sierra Nevada and into Yosemite National Park. Entering Yosemite, SR 120 is known as Big Oak Flat Road as it heads towards Crane Flat. After leaving Crane Flat, Big Oak Flat Road turns southeast towards Yosemite Valley, while SR 120 continues east as Tioga Pass Road (or often simply Tioga Road). The highway retains that name as it travels through Tuolumne Meadows, over Tioga Pass at an elevation of 9,945 feet, and through the Lee Vining Canyon on its  journey to its intersection with U.S. Route 395, at Lee Vining.  After a jog to the south along US 395, it continues east as Mono Mills Road, skirting the south end of Mono Lake and providing access to the Mono Lake South Tufa as well as the historical site of Mono Mills before cresting Sagehen Summit and ending with the intersection of U.S. Route 6 at Benton.  Both the portions through Yosemite National Park and the stretch between Mono Lake and Benton are subject to winter closure.  Usually the highway is open through Tioga Pass by the Memorial Day weekend at the end of May, and typically closes for the winter sometime in November. 

Tioga Road/Big Oak Flat Road is officially both a National Scenic Byway and a National Forest Scenic Byway. The segment through the Lee Vining Canyon between the eastern edge of Yosemite and US 395 is designated as the Lee Vining Canyon Scenic Byway, a separate National Forest Scenic Byway.

SR 120 is part of the California Freeway and Expressway System, and both the western portion and the eastern portion west of US 395 are part of the National Highway System, a network of highways that are considered essential to the country's economy, defense, and mobility by the Federal Highway Administration. SR 120 is eligible to be included in the State Scenic Highway System, but it is not officially designated as a scenic highway by the California Department of Transportation. The Tioga Pass Road was designated as a California Historic Civil Engineering Landmark by the American Society of Civil Engineers in 2002.

History

During the Gold Rush, SR 120 was originally known as Big Oak Flat Road, after the village of Big Oak Flat through which it passes in the Sierra foothills.  It was a pack trail from Stockton which became popular with prospectors about 1849. By 1874 it was a wagon road which extended to Yosemite Valley.

In 1921, the California State Assembly authorized San Joaquin County to transfer the county road connecting Manteca with then-Route 5 (now I-5) at Mossdale to the state. It was numbered Route 66, as was a 1933 extension from Manteca east to Route 13 in Oakdale. Also in 1933, Route 40 was extended east from Mono Lake to Route 76 (US 6) at Benton. The route from Manteca to Benton was marked as Sign Route 120 in 1934, and was soon extended west to Mossdale, replacing what had been part of U.S. Route 99W.

Priest grades
West of Priest is a section of highway with over one hundred curves and hairpin turns, known as the "New Priest Grade."  With a 4% grade, it opened in 1915 and was built by a group of local volunteers who desired an alternative to the very steep (17%) Old Priest Grade.   Today, both grades are paved, but trailers and RVs are prohibited from Old Priest Grade. There is a 7,500-pound weight limit on the old grade.

Major intersections

See also

References

Map: "Stanislaus National Forest, California," U.S. Forest Service, 1979.

External links

A Brief History Of The Tioga Road
Caltrans: Route 120 Road Conditions
Tioga Road (Highway 120 through the Yosemite National Park) conditions
California @ AARoads.com - State Route 120
California Highways: SR 120

120
State Route 120
State Route 120
State Route 120
State Route 120
State Route 120
State Route 120
120
U.S. Route 99